Yordan Bikov (born 17 November 1950) is a retired Bulgarian middleweight weightlifter. He won the clean and jerk event at the 1971 World Championships. In 1972 he won the European title and Olympic gold medal, setting a new world record in the total. He retired next year after placing second at the European championships, and became a weightlifting coach.

References

External links

 
 
 
 

1950 births
Living people
Bulgarian male weightlifters
Weightlifters at the 1972 Summer Olympics
Olympic gold medalists for Bulgaria
Olympic medalists in weightlifting
Sportspeople from Pazardzhik
Olympic weightlifters of Bulgaria
World record setters in weightlifting
European champions in weightlifting
Medalists at the 1972 Summer Olympics
European Weightlifting Championships medalists
World Weightlifting Championships medalists
20th-century Bulgarian people
21st-century Bulgarian people